Euphorbia meloformis, called the melon spurge, is a species of flowering plant in the genus Euphorbia, native to the Cape Provinces of South Africa. A succulent, it has gained the Royal Horticultural Society's Award of Garden Merit.

References

meloformis
meloformis
Endemic flora of South Africa
Plants described in 1789